Syllepte stumpffalis is a moth in the family Crambidae. It is found in Madagascar.

References

Moths described in 1960
stumpffalis
Moths of Madagascar